Kim Seong-joo (born 23 August 1998) is a South Korean footballer who plays for Jeonnam Dragons.

Club

References

External links 
 

1998 births
Living people
South Korean footballers
K League 1 players
K League 2 players
Jeonnam Dragons players
Daejeon Hana Citizen FC players
Association football forwards